"Rainbow" is a song recorded by American country music artist Kacey Musgraves. It was released as the fifth and final single from Musgraves' third studio album, Golden Hour (2018) in February 2019. Musgraves co-wrote the song with Shane McAnally and Natalie Hemby. Its release coincided with her performance at the 61st Annual Grammy Awards. 

"Rainbow" was nominated for Song of the Year and won Music Video of the Year at the 53rd Annual Country Music Association Awards. It was nominated for Single of the Year at the 55th Academy of Country Music Awards.

Content
"Rainbow" is a piano ballad in the key of E-flat major with a slow tempo of approximately 64 beats per minute. Musgraves' vocals range from G-E. The song was penned by Musgraves with Shane McAnally and Natalie Hemby six years prior to its release as the closing track on Golden Hour. According to the singer, it began as an encouraging note to herself and transformed into "a message of hope for anyone in the midst of dark times." It holds significance for Musgraves for several reasons, as it was the last song her grandmother heard her write and was played at her funeral, and she also noted that she hoped the song would be an anthem for those facing adversity, such as those in the LGBT community.

Live performances
Musgraves performed "Rainbow" on Late Night with Seth Meyers on June 20, 2018.

She performed the song live on the 61st Annual Grammy Awards on February 10, 2019. During the show, Musgraves won the Grammy for Album of the Year for its parent album Golden Hour, in addition to Best Country Album. For the performance, Musgraves donned a simple white gown and was accompanied by a pianist playing a rainbow piano behind her.

The song was performed on the Together at Home global concert event on April 18, 2020.

Music video
The music video was directed by Hannah Lux Davis (who also directed her "High Horse" music video), and premiered on February 10, 2019, coinciding with her performance on the Grammy Awards. In it, various characters are shown in different rooms of a dimly lit house, including "a single mother taking care of her child, a man facing his alcohol abuse, a young person wrestling with gender identity, and a teenager caught in the middle of a family crisis." Scenes of Musgraves performing the song either accompanying the others or alone are mixed in throughout the video and near the end she is seen sitting on the floor of a room surrounded by lush greenery and flowers as a rainbow appears overhead.

Commercial performance
"Rainbow" debuted at No. 58 on the Billboard Country Airplay chart for the chart dated February 16, 2019. In its second week, it entered the top 40, making it her highest-peaking single since "Keep It to Yourself" in 2014. It also debuted at No. 17 on the Billboard Hot Country Songs chart and at No. 98 on the Billboard Hot 100. On the latter, it became her first song to chart in six years. The song was certified Gold by the RIAA  on October 18, 2019, it has sold 143,000 copies in the United States as of January 2020.

Charts

Weekly charts

Year-end charts

Certifications

References

2019 singles
Kacey Musgraves songs
Songs written by Shane McAnally
MCA Nashville Records singles
2018 songs
Songs written by Kacey Musgraves
2010s ballads
Country ballads
Songs written by Natalie Hemby
LGBT-related songs
Music videos directed by Hannah Lux Davis